Bindyarani Devi Sorokhaibam (born 27 January 1999) is an Indian weightlifter who competes in the 55 kg weight class.

Career 
She won gold at the 2019 Commonwealth Weightlifting Championships and silver at the 2021 Commonwealth Weightlifting Championships. She also won gold in clean and jerk at the 2021 World Weightlifting Championships.

She won the silver medal at the 2022 Commonwealth Games with a total lift of 202 kg. She also broke Games record and national record in clean and jerk by lifting 116 kg.

References

External links

Meitei people
Living people
1999 births
Indian female weightlifters
Weightlifters from Manipur
Sportswomen from Manipur
Commonwealth Games silver medallists for India
Weightlifters at the 2022 Commonwealth Games
Commonwealth Games medallists in weightlifting
21st-century Indian women
Medallists at the 2022 Commonwealth Games